Towaco may refer to:
Towaco, New Jersey, an unincorporated village within Montville Township, Morris County
Towaco (NJT station), a New Jersey Transit station in Towaco
Towaco Formation, a mapped bedrock unit of New Jersey